Ambassadors of Italy have been sent to Romania from as early as October 27, 1878, when the Romanian Principality gained its independence from the Ottoman Empire (as a result of the Russo-Turkish War of 1877–1878).

Annibale Strambio was appointed Consul and Agent of the Kingdom of Sardinia in Bucharest soon after the emergence of the United Principalities through the 1859 union between Moldavia and Wallachia (at a time when, in the aftermath of the Crimean War, Sardinia was one of the European powers overseeing the new state). Between the two dates, Sardinia ensured Italian unification, with Strambio being the first to represent the new Italian state.

Consuls and Agents (1859-1878)

Ministers Plenipotentiary (1878-1945)

Chargés d'Affaires (1945-1947)

Ministers Plenipotentiary (1947-1964)

Ambassadors (1964-)

References

Site of the Italian Embassy in Bucharest ( Cronologia dei capi di missione italiani in Romania;  Cronologia şefilor de misiune italieni în România)
 Mihai Pelin (Jurnalul Naţional), 
"Supravegheaţi - Diplomaţi italieni sub lupa Securităţii" ("Under Surveillance - Italian Diplomats under the Securitate's Magnifying Glass"), January 4, 2007
"Operaţiunea 'Infiltrarea' - Legaţia italiană sub asediul regimului comunist (5)" ("Operation 'Infiltration' - the Italian Legation under the Siege of the Communist Regime" (5)), March 15, 2007

Romania
Italy
Ambassadors of Italy to Romania